Utetheisa variolosa is a moth in the family Erebidae. It was described by Cajetan Felder, Rudolf Felder and Alois Friedrich Rogenhofer in 1869. It is found on the Nicobar Islands in the eastern Indian Ocean.

References

Moths described in 1869
variolosa